The Official Languages of the Union Act, 1925 ( ), was an Act of the Parliament of South Africa that included Afrikaans as a variety of the Dutch language.

The Act commenced on 27 May 1925, but deemed to have had effect since the creation of the Union in 1910, having the effect of making Afrikaans an official language of the Union of South Africa since that date.

Background

Ambiguity 
The South Africa Act of 1909—the constitution of the Union—declared the English and Dutch languages to be the state's official languages.

Part 8, section 137, of the South Africa Act read:

Provision 
Doubts soon arose about the status of the Afrikaans language and whether its status as a Dutch daughter language implied it to be on equal footing.

The single substantive provision of the Official Languages Act reads:

Repeal 
The South Africa Act and the Official Languages Act were repealed by the Constitution of 1961, which reversed the position of Afrikaans and Dutch. Subsequently, English and Afrikaans were the official languages, and Afrikaans was deemed to include Dutch.

The Constitution of 1983 removed any mention of Dutch altogether.

Bibliography

External links 
 "Official Language of the Union Act, 1925" at Wikisource 

1925 in South African law
Repealed South African legislation